Johann Karl Kappeler (23 March 1816 – 20 October 1888) was a Swiss politician and President of the Swiss Council of States (1851/1852, 1854/1855, 1872 and 1881).

External links 

1816 births
1888 deaths
People from Frauenfeld
Swiss Calvinist and Reformed Christians
Members of the Council of States (Switzerland)
Presidents of the Council of States (Switzerland)
Federal Supreme Court of Switzerland judges
19th-century Swiss judges
19th-century Swiss politicians